The 2021–22 East Carolina Pirates men's basketball team represented East Carolina University during the 2021–22 NCAA Division I men's basketball season. The Pirates were led by fourth year head coach, Joe Dooley, who previously coached the Pirates from 1995 to 1999, and played their home games at Williams Arena at Minges Coliseum as eighth-year members of the American Athletic Conference.

Previous season
The Pirates finished the 2020–21  season 8–11, 2–10 in AAC play to finish in last place. They lost in the first round of the AAC tournament to UCF.

Offseason

Departures

Incoming transfers

2021 recruiting class

Roster

Schedule and results

|-
!colspan=12 style=| Non-conference regular season

|-
!colspan=12 style=| AAC Regular Season

|-
!colspan=12 style=| AAC tournament

Source

References

East Carolina Pirates men's basketball seasons
East Carolina
East Carolina Pirates men's basketball
East Carolina Pirates men's basketball